Skjønberg is a surname. Notable people with the surname include:

Espen Skjønberg (1924–2022), Norwegian actor 
Eugen Skjønberg (1889–1971), Norwegian actor
Henny Skjønberg (1886–1973), Norwegian actress and stage director
Pål Skjønberg (1919–2014), Norwegian actor
Tom Skjønberg (1948–2019), Norwegian sailor